Arashi Around Asia 2008 in Tokyo is a DVD release of Japanese boy band Arashi. It was released on March 25, 2009 by their record label J Storm. Arashi Around Asia 2008 in Tokyo documented the second day (September 6, 2008) of Arashi's first concert at the National Stadium in Tokyo.

Concert tour

Tour information
During the group's performance in Tokyo Dome on June 15, 2008, it was announced that they would hold their second Asia Tour by the end of the year. Titled Arashi Marks Arashi Around Asia 2008, the tour began at the National Stadium in Tokyo, in which the group became the third musical act after SMAP and Dreams Come True to hold concerts there. The tour then continued to Seoul, Taipei and Shanghai, a Johnny & Associates first.

Tour dates
September 5: Tokyo, Japan
September 6: Tokyo, Japan
October 11: Taipei, Taiwan
October 12: Taipei, Taiwan
November 1: Seoul, Korea
November 2: Seoul, Korea
November 15: Shanghai, China

Set list
Special Footage
Arashi's Fight in Kokuritsu

Set list
"Overture"
"Love So Sweet"
"Oh Yeah!"
"Kitto Daijōbu"
"La Tormenta 2004"
"Happiness"
"Hadashi no Mirai"
"Aozora Pedal"
"Hello Goodbye" (Masaki Aiba solo)
"Subarashiki Sekai"
"Tomadoi Nagara"
"Still..."
"Lucky Man"
"Take Me Faraway" (Satoshi Ohno solo)
"Niji" (Kazunari Ninomiya solo)
"Smile"
"Wave"
"Carnival Night Part 2"
MC
"Kaze no Mukō e"
"Re(mark)able"
"Truth"
"Step and Go"
"A Day in Our Life"
"Tell Me What You Wanna Be?" (Jun Matsumoto solo)
"Ichioku No Hoshi"
"Sirius"
"Hip Pop Boogie" (Sho Sakurai solo)
"Arashi"
"Pikanchi Double"
"Asu Ni Mukatte Hoeru"
"One Love"

Encore 1
"Kansha Kangeki Ame Arashi"
"Fight Song"
"Kaze"
"Kotoba Yori Taisetsu na Mono"

Encore 2 
"Sakura Sake"
"Wish"
"Gori Muchu"

Chart performance
The DVD sold 230,000 copies in its first week and held the record for highest first week sales of 2009 until the release of the group's music video collection DVD 5x10 All the Best! Clips 1999–2009 on October 28, 2009. It is also the fourth in history for first week sales among music DVDs to date (behind their own 5x10 All the Best! Clips 1999–2009 of 428,000, KAT-TUN's Real Face Film of 374,000 and SMAP's Live MIJ of 281,000), the first DVD to top the comprehensive sales category for three consecutive weeks, and the first music DVD in history to hold the number one spot in the first half of the year in Japan. 

By the end of 2009, Oricon announced that the DVD was the second best-selling music DVD of the year in Japan, right after 5x10 All the Best! Clips 1999–2009.

In 2010, Arashi Around Asia 2008 in Tokyo sold another 85,453 copies, making it the thirty-eighth best-selling DVD overall for 2010 in Japan.

Charts and certifications

Charts

Sales and certifications

Release history

Awards

Japan Gold Disc Awards

|-
| 2010
| Arashi Around Asia 2008 in Tokyo
| The Best Music Videos
|

References

External links
Arashi Around Asia 2008 in Tokyo at J Storm
Arashi Around Asia 2008 in Tokyo at Oricon

Arashi video albums
2009 video albums
Live video albums
2009 live albums
J Storm video albums